The men's doubles of the 2012 CNGvitall Prague Open tournament was played on clay in Prague, Czech Republic.

František Čermák and Lukáš Rosol were the defending champions but Čermák decided not to participate.
Rosol played alongside Horacio Zeballos and won the title by defeating Martin Kližan and Igor Zelenay 7–5, 2–6, [12–10] in the final.

Seeds

Draw

Draw

External Links
 Main Draw

Strabag Prague Open - Doubles
2012 - Men's Doubles